Lelant is a village in west Cornwall, England, UK. The village is part of St Ives civil parish (meaning that it falls within the parish area of St Ives Town Council), the Lelant and Carbis Bay ward on Cornwall Council, and also the St Ives Parliamentary constituency. The birth, marriage, and death registration district is Penzance. Its population at the 2011 census was 3,892 The South West Coast Path, which follows the coast of south west England from Somerset to Dorset passes through Lelant, along the estuary and above Porth Kidney Sands.

History

The name is derived from the Cornish lann and Anta, meaning church-site of Anta. The earliest attested spelling is Lananta in about 1170. Nothing is known about Anta, and Lelant parish church is dedicated to St Uny. However, Carbis Bay church is dedicated to St Anta. Arthur Langdon (1896) records eight stone crosses in the parish, of which four are in the churchyard; the other crosses are at Brunian Cairn, Lelant Lane, Sea Lane and the churchtown.

At one time Lelant was an important town and seaport having a market and a custom-house. A parish terrier of 1727 describing the bounds of the glebe land states that about 50 acres of land, and the vicarage, were overwhelmed by sand. The terrier does not give a date but does say that it was not in the living memory of man. In the spring of 1875, during the building of the railway line between St Erth railway station and St Ives, several human skeletons, graves and a building were found by a gang of navvies. Observers of the building thought it was of an ecclesiastical nature, and it is possible that it is the site of a pre-Norman church, burial ground and the former Lelant town. Lelant was formerly an ecclesiastical parish  being the mother church of both Towednack and St Ives. The parish church of St Uny's Church, Lelant is situated at the east end of the village on the edge of the towans and overlooking the West Cornwall Golf Club. Lelant was a seaport in the Middle Ages, but the trade was lost to St Ives when the estuary silted up.

At Lower Lelant is a house called The Abbey which was built in the 16th century and renovated in the 18th. In 1831 it was reported that much granite was quarried here, and that there were several tin mines nearby. The family of Praed were landowners here for many centuries. The early 19th century politician and poet Winthrop Mackworth Praed was a member of the family, though he did not live in Cornwall.

The local community radio station is Coast FM (formerly Penwith Radio), which broadcasts on 96.5 and 97.2 FM.

On 15 October 1878, the School Board Office of Uny Lelant advertised for tenders for the building of a school to accommodate 234 children. The architect was Silvanus Trevail of Tywardreath.

Transport

Lelant lies on the short A3074 road that leads to Carbis Bay and St Ives, just to the north of the main A30 after it bypasses Hayle and where it swings southwestwards across country towards Penzance on the south coast, about six miles away.

The village is served by two railway stations on the St Ives branch. The original station, Lelant, was built by the Great Western Railway in 1877 to serve Lelant village. Lelant Saltings was built in 1978 as a park and ride station to relieve traffic congestion in St Ives and Carbis Bay. However, in June 2019, the park and ride facilities closed.

The St Michael’s Way trail, established in 1994, starts at Lelant parish church and terminates  later on the south coast at St Michael's Mount. The initial segment of this modern pilgrim route coincides with the South West Coast Path as far as the western end of Carbis Bay.

Sport
The West Cornwall Golf Club is situated to the east of the village overlooking St Ives Bay and Godrevy Island. It is the oldest golf club in Cornwall. St Ives Town play in the Cornwall Combination, a level 12 league in the English football league system. They play their home matches at the Saltings, which is between the village and Lelant Saltings railway station.

Notable people
 Jim Barnes, golfer; winner of the PGA Championship, the U.S. Open, and the British Open
 Philip Christophers, member of the Legislative Assembly of Alberta, Canada
 Rosamunde Pilcher, author of romance novels

References

External links

 St Ives Town Council

Villages in Cornwall
Populated coastal places in Cornwall
Penwith
St Ives, Cornwall